Benedetta Rosmunda Pisaroni (born Piacenza, 16 May 1793 – died Piacenza, 6 August 1872) was an Italian soprano who later became a contralto.

She was born as Benedetta Pisaroni to Giambattista Pisaroni and Luigia Pratti. Active on the operatic stage from 1811 to 1831, she suffered from smallpox in the early years of her career, which caused a change (downward) in her extended vocal range.

Appearing in Bergamo, Padua, Bologna, Venice, Milan, Rome, and eventually Paris in the 1810s and 1820s, she was closely associated with the operas of Gioachino Rossini and Giacomo Meyerbeer.

Roles created
Romilda in Meyerbeer's Romilda e Costanza (1817)
Zomira in Rossini's Ricciardo e Zoraide (1818)
Andromaca in Rossini's Ermione (1819)
Malcolm in Rossini's La donna del lago (1819)
Almanzor in Meyerbeer's L'esule di Granata (1821)

Sources
Forbes, Elizabeth (1992), 'Pisaroni, Benedetta Rosmunda' in The New Grove Dictionary of Opera, ed. Stanley Sadie (London) 

1793 births
1872 deaths
People from Piacenza
Italian contraltos
Italian operatic sopranos
Operatic contraltos
19th-century Italian women opera singers